The 1929–30 Tercera División season was the first season since its establishment.

Group 1

Group 1–A

League table

Group 1–B

Play-off

|}

Tiebreaker

|}

Group 1–Finals

Play-off

|}

Group 2

League table

Group 3

Play-off 

|}

Tiebreaker 

|}

Group 4

League table

Group 5

League table

Group 6

League table

Group 7

League table

Group 8

League table

Promotion play-off

Bracket

External links
AREFE

Tercera División seasons
3
Spain